Redoubt No. 2, also known as Fort No Name, is a historic archaeological site located near Stafford, Stafford County, Virginia.  The site was the central of the three, perhaps four, Federal defensive fortifications ordered constructed in early (February) 1863 during the American Civil War to protect the approaches to the Union supply depot at Aquia Creek Landing, Stafford, Virginia. Redoubt No.2 is an earthen field fortification that is nearly 95 feet square.

It was listed on the National Register of Historic Places in 2006.

References

Archaeological sites on the National Register of Historic Places in Virginia
National Register of Historic Places in Stafford County, Virginia